Thomas "Swede" Knox (March 2, 1948 – March 22, 2021) was a National Hockey League (NHL) linesman. He officiated over 2,248 NHL games, starting in 1972, and wore a helmet from the mid-1980s until his retirement in 2000. He also officiated five Stanley Cup Finals and one NHL All-Star Game.

Early life
Knox was born in Edmonton, Alberta, Canada. As a youth, he was a longtime member of the equipment staff for the Edmonton Oil Kings, and is credited with staff on the roster for the team's 1963 Memorial Cup championship. His brother, Jim, was a goaltender for the Oil Kings' 1966 Memorial Cup championship.

Career
Knox started his NHL career based in Toronto, due to league rules regarding on ice officials' proximity to an NHL city.

Knox once filled in as referee during a game in Toronto in the early 1990s, when Don Koharski could not finish the game.

Personal life
Knox graduated from Athabasca University in 1999 with a Bachelor of Administration degree.

Knox died of cancer March 22, 2021.

References

External links
Flyers History

1948 births
2021 deaths
Athabasca University alumni
National Hockey League officials
Ice hockey people from Edmonton